Arnold Buchthal (born 28 November 1900 in Dortmund, Germany; died 5 August 1965 in Pesaro, Italy) was a German lawyer, a translator at the Nuremberg trials and a State's attorney in Frankfurt.

Life 
Arnold Buchthal was the son of Rosa and Felix Buchthal. His mother was the first woman in the Dortmund city council, while his father ran a coffee import and roasting facility with some branches in the city. Arnold grew up in the new building built by the parents at Bornstraße 19. He graduated from high school in 1918 at the Municipal Gymnasium. As part of his law studies he came in 1923 as a trainee to the Higher Regional Court Hamm and 1924 to Dortmund district court. Later he was district and county magistrate with an annual salary of 7800 Reichsmark. He spoke five languages.

With the seizure of power by the National Socialists in January 1933, within a few months all Jewish citizens in civil servant positions were dismissed. Arnold Buchthal, son of Jewish parents, "full Jew" in Nazi jargon, was one of them. He received his dismissal from the Prussian Ministry of Justice on July 7, 1933. He and his wife Grete could barely pay for the medical delivery costs of the second daughter (the businesswoman and philanthropist Steve Shirley) in September 1933.

The family emigrated to Austria at the end of 1933. After the annexation of Austria by the German Reich in 1938, the survival of Jews became problematic there. To save the lives of their daughters, the parents in 1939 sent them off with a Kindertransport from Vienna to England. Renate, born in 1929, emigrated to Australia much later, Vera became one of England's most successful entrepreneurs in the 1970s and was named Dame Stephanie in 2000 and Companion of Honour in 2018.

Arnold Buchthal and his wife Grete (née Schick), born in Krems, Austria, separated. The main reason for the discord was Grete's accusation of having to suffer as a non-Jew from his political problems. Arnold Buchthal emigrated to Switzerland and little later to England. Like all male adults who fled Nazi Germany, he was considered an "enemy alien". The British immigration authorities deported him – along with some 2,000 Jewish refugees and 400 German and Italian prisoners of war – to Australia in 1940, where they were sent to the prison camp in Hay, New South Wales. Only a debate in the British Parliament ensured that the survivors of that incarceration came back to England.

From 1941 on Arnold Buchthal belonged to an auxiliary team of British troops.

After the Second World War Buchthal transferred to the American Army and was called as a translator to the Nuremberg war crimes trials. Among other things, he had to explain to the US judges words like "Polnisches Untermenschentum", a racist term in Nazi language. Arnold Buchthal moved to Offenbach and went into civil service. Until October 1957 he was senior prosecutor of the Frankfurt district court. In this function he had to deal with the pending case against the Nazi war criminals Adolf Eichmann and his deputy Hermann Krumey. Buchthal cooperated in this matter with his colleague Fritz Bauer, who the Attorney General of Hesse, and the driving force to organize the Frankfurt Auschwitz trials. Buchthal also received criticism: As prosecutor he acted rashly against a controversial election campaign ad published in several newspapers in 1957. As a result he was transferred as Senate President at the Higher Regional Court to Darmstadt. Buchthal died in Italy in 1965.

References

1900 births
1965 deaths
People from Dortmund
20th-century German lawyers
Jurists from North Rhine-Westphalia